Miljkovići is a village in the municipality of Velika Kladuša, Bosnia and Herzegovina. It is located just northeast of Velika Kladuša town.

Demographics 
According to the 2013 census, its population was 2,517.

References

Populated places in Velika Kladuša